The Japanese honours system is a system implemented for rewarding awards to Japanese and non-Japanese persons for their achievements and service to Japan.

Established during the 1870s shortly after the Meiji Restoration, it was modelled on European systems of orders and decorations. The first order, the Imperial Order of Meiji, was established in 1875, and was later renamed as the Order of the Rising Sun.

Overview 
Orders and decorations in Japan consist of the conferral of honours and awards, medals, and titles (the latter abolished in 1947), which were established during the Meiji period as a system for the state to recognise individuals' achievements. 

The Decoration Bureau of the Cabinet Office is responsible for administrative duties relating to the conferment of awards, research on the honours system, and planning. The awarding of honours is one of the prescribed constitutional functions of the Emperor of Japan, with the advice of the Cabinet.

Recommendation system 
Since 2003, the Government of Japan through the Decoration Bureau uses a recommendation system in members of the public can recommend candidates for the honours.

Process

Recommendation from the public 

 A recommender from the public submits an application to the Decoration Bureau. One recommender and two approvers are required for the application to be processed, with applications received throughout the year.
 Once an application is approved for review, the Decoration Bureau and relevant ministries and agencies conducts research and development.

Recommendations from ministries and agencies 

 Ministries and/or government agencies submits an application to the Decoration Bureau.
 Request for discussions regarding the candidates at Cabinet meetings submitted.
 Information about potential recipients reported to the Emperor.
 Official announcement in media.

Current Orders

Supreme Order of the Chrysanthemum 

Established in 1876, this is the premier order of Japan, originally in one class (Grand Cordon) and expanded to two classes (Collar; Grand Cordon) in 1888.
Collar – The highest possible honour that may be conferred. The Collar is only worn by the reigning Emperor, and is normally only awarded to foreign monarchs as a courtesy. Before 1947, the Collar was also conferred upon extremely eminent Cabinet ministers, senior members of the Imperial family and certain senior military officers of the rank of Marshal. It may be posthumously awarded to extremely distinguished Prime Ministers of Japan; the last such award was to Shinzo Abe in 2022.
Grand Cordon – Typically conferred upon royals of the Imperial House of Japan, foreign royalty who are not reigning monarchs, certain foreign non-royal Heads of State, and select Japanese Prime Ministers. Until 1947, the Grand Cordon was often conferred upon eminent military officers of the rank of Marshal. Often conferred posthumously.

Order of the Paulownia Flowers 

Established in 1888 as a Special Grand Cordon to the Order of the Rising Sun, it was later made a separate order in 2003. Ordinarily the highest regularly awarded honour, it is conferred in a single class (Grand Cordon); typically awarded to Japanese prime ministers, senior statesmen, select foreign heads of government, distinguished cabinet ministers and jurists. Until 1947, it was also awarded to distinguished military officers of the rank of General or higher, or its equivalents.

Order of the Rising Sun 

The order was established in 1875 as Japan's first order. Awarded in nine classes prior to 2003: The Grand Cordon of the order is typically awarded to foreign heads of government, chairpersons of prominent international organizations and leading politicians, business leaders and diplomats. The second class is typically conferred upon prominent academics, politicians and military officers. The third through sixth classes are ordinarily conferred upon individuals who have made significant contributions to Japan in varying degrees. The 7th and 8th classes of the Order were abolished in 2003, and the Special First Class of the Order was renamed the Order of the Paulownia Flowers.
1st Class: Grand  Cordon
2nd Class: Gold and Silver Star
3rd Class: Gold Rays with Neck Ribbon
4th Class: Gold Rays with Rosette
5th Class: Gold and Silver Rays
6th Class: Silver Rays

Order of the Sacred Treasure 

This order was established in 1888 as the Imperial Order of Meiji in eight classes. Since the revision of the honours system in 2003, the Order of the Sacred Treasure has been awarded to civil servants for their long-term contributions. They include government and local officials, military personnel, scholars of national universities, and school teachers. For example, from 2014, the former Chief of Staff, Joint Staff is awarded Grand Cordon of the Order of the Sacred Treasure at the age of 70. The 7th and 8th classes were abolished in 2003.
1st Class: Grand Cordon
2nd Class: Gold and Silver Star
3rd Class: Gold Rays with Neck Ribbon
4th Class: Gold Rays with Rosette
5th Class: Gold and Silver Rays
6th Class: Silver Rays

Order of Culture 

Established in 1937, this is a single-class order of merit to honour those who have made outstanding contributions to Japanese culture. Japanese Nobel Laureates are awarded the Order of Culture.

Order of the Precious Crown 

Established in 1888 in five classes, the order expanded to seven classes in 1896. The 7th class of the order was abolished sometime after the Second World War. It was initially awarded to select foreigners who were not eligible for a higher honour but subsequently only awarded to women. From 2003, with the opening of the Order of the Rising Sun to Japanese women, the order has only been awarded to foreign females.
1st Class: Grand Cordon
2nd Class: Peony Class
3rd Class: Butterfly Class
4th Class: Wisteria Class
5th Class: Apricot Class
6th Class: Ripple Class

Medals of Honour 

Established in 1881, the Medals of Honour honour individuals who have made distinguished achievements in their respective fields of society. The different medal categories can be seen below.
Medal with Red Ribbon
Medal with Green Ribbon
Medal with Yellow Ribbon
Medal with Purple Ribbon
Medal with Blue Ribbon
Medal with Dark Blue Ribbon

Medals of current orders and their classes 
The current types of Japanese orders, their classes and medals can be seen below.

Conferral of decoration diplomas 

In addition to the decorations, the recipient to one of the orders is also awarded a decoration diploma. The diploma is a certificate bearing the name of the recipient, the name of the order awarded, the date of the award, the name of the awarding authority, etc., along with the State Seal of Japan. The text and content of the diploma according to the type of decoration. All the text in the diplomas is written vertically.

 For recipients of the Grand Cordon of the Supreme Order of the Chrysanthemum, Grand Cordon of the Order of the Paulownia Flowers, Grand Cordon of the Order of the Rising Sun, Grand Cordon of the Order of the Sacred Treasure, and the Order of Culture:
 日本国天皇は　○ ○ ○ ○　に
 　　○ ○ ○ ○　　を授与する
 皇居においてみずから名を署し
 璽をおさせる
 御名国璽
 令和○年○月○日
 　　内閣総理大臣○○○○印
 　　　内閣府賞勲局長○○○○印
 第○○○○号

 
 The Emperor of Japan will confer [name of the order]
 to [name of recipient]. 
 At the Imperial Palace, you will be asked to
 sign and seal your name.
 Imperial Seal                                                                                                                                                      
 Reiwa YYYY MM DD
      Prime Minister [name and personal seal]
      Chief Cabinet Secretary [name and personal seal]
 Number XXXX

 For recipients of other orders and honours:

 日本国天皇は○ ○ ○ ○に
 　 ○ ○ ○ ○　を授与する
 皇居において璽をおさせる
 国璽
 令和○年○月○日
 　　 内閣総理大臣○○○○印
 　　　　 内閣府賞勲局長○○○○印
 第○○○○号

 The Emperor of Japan will confer [name of the order]
 to [name of recipient].
 At the Imperial Palace, you will be asked to
 sign and seal your name.
 State Seal
 Reiwa YYYY MM DD
      Prime Minister [name and personal seal]
      Chief Cabinet Secretary [name and personal seal]
 Number XXXX
In cases where signature of the Emperor and State Seal is affixed at a location other than the Tokyo Imperial Palace, e.g., Akasaka Palace, the diplomas will reflect the change and use "Akasaka Palace" instead.

The National Printing Bureau, an independent administrative agency of the Government of Japan, handles papermaking and printing of the diplomas for the decoration. In addition to the text, signature, Imperial Seal, and State Seal mentioned above, the design of the awarded order is imprinted on the medal. This model is printed using the decalcomania technique. In this technique, a skilled craftsman manually adds colours to the transfer paper one by one, which takes several days. In addition, a chrysanthemum crest is printed just above the centre of the medal. This chrysanthemum crest was also created by applying pure gold powder after gold under-printing, and then performing blank pressing (embossing).

Criteria for honours (Japanese nationals)
In order for Japanese nationals to be awarded, they must meet certain criteria specified by the Government of Japan.

Statistics
As of November 2021, a total of 150,632 orders have been conferred upon living Japanese nationals since 2003, when the honours system was overhauled. These include 19 awards of the Order of the Paulownia Flowers, 34,593 awards of the Order of the Rising Sun and 116,020 awards of the Order of the Sacred Treasure. Of those decorations, the Order of the Sacred Treasure (77.02% of the total, all classes) is the most commonly conferred decoration, followed by the Order of the Rising Sun (22.97% of the total, all classes). The Order of the Paulownia Flowers is conferred the most rarely, at only 0.13% of the total number of decorations awarded since 2003. 

Per class of decoration, excluding the Order of the Chrysanthemum, the breakdown of decorations awarded by level since 2003 is as follows:

354 awards at the level of Grand Cordon (0.24% of total)
1,744 at the level of Gold and Silver Star (1.16% of total)
11,917 at the level of Gold Rays with Neck Ribbon (7.91% of total) 
33,461 at the level of Gold Rays with Rosette (22.21% of total) 
58,466 at the level of Gold and Silver Rays (38.81% of total)
44,690 at the level of Silver Rays (29.67% of total) 

Since 2003, the most commonly conferred decorations by class and level in the top five categories as of 2021 have been: 
Silver Rays of the Order of the Sacred Treasure (40,564 awards; 26.93% of total)
Gold  and Silver Rays of the Order of the Sacred Treasure (38,268 awards; 25.40% of total)
Gold Rays with Rosette of the Order of the Sacred Treasure (25,692 awards; 17.06% of total)
Gold and Silver Rays of the Order of the Rising Sun (20,198 awards; 13.41% of total)
Gold Rays with Neck Ribbon of the Order of the Sacred Treasure (10,104 awards; 6.71% of total)

For the year 2021, 8,172 decorations were conferred in the following numbers upon living Japanese:

Order of the Paulownia Flowers (0 awards; 0.000% of total)
Grand Cordon: 0
Order of the Rising Sun (1,912 awards; 23.40% of total)
Grand Cordon: 4
Gold and Silver Star: 19
Gold Rays with Neck Ribbon: 89
Gold Rays with Rosette: 370
Gold and Silver Rays: 1,056
Silver Rays: 374
Order of the Sacred Treasure (6,260 awards; 76.60% of total)
Grand Cordon: 4
Gold and Silver Star: 67
Gold Rays with Neck Ribbon: 611
Gold Rays with Rosette: 1,328
Gold and Silver Rays: 2,040
Silver Rays: 2,188

Past system

2003 revision
In the system before the 2003 revision, titles consisted of two parts, the class number  and the decoration. For example:

although their official English translations did not have these class numbers. The 2003 revision removed the class part from the titles, thus:

See also
 List of honours of Japan awarded to heads of state and royalty

Notes

References

External links

 Cabinet Office (Japan): Decorations and Medals 
 List of recent recipients (in Japanese)
 Ministry of Foreign Affairs (Japan): List of recent recipients of foreign nationals
 Japan Mint: Production process of medals